The Book of Mormon describes a number of individuals unique to its narrative as prophets. Here, the prophets included are those who, according to the narrative, inherited the plates of Nephi and who otherwise are called prophets within the text.  Also included are the high priests mentioned and the missionaries.

In Nephi
The following prophets (or in some cases, simply people who kept the record and passed it to future generations) are those mentioned in the plates of Nephi (1 Nephi through Omni).
 Lehi
 Nephi
 Jacob
 Enos
 Jarom
 Omni
 Amaron
 Chemish
 Abinadom
 Amaleki
 Neum
 Zenos
 Zenock

In Mormon and Moroni
The following prophets are those mentioned in Mormon's abridgement of the large plates of Nephi (Mosiah through Moroni, excluding Ether).
 King Benjamin
 Mosiah
 Ammon
 Abinadi
 Alma the Elder
 Alma the Younger
 Sons of Mosiah
 Aaron
 Ammon
 Omner
 Himni
 Amulek
 Zeezrom
 Helaman
 Shiblon
 Corianton, after his repentance
 Helaman II
 Nephi
 Lehi
 Samuel the Lamanite
 Lachoneus the Chief Judge
 Gidgiddoni
 Disciples of Christ
 Nephi
 Timothy
 Nephi, son of Nephi the Disciple
 Jonas, the son of Nephi
 Mathoni
 Mathonihah
 Kumen
 Kumenonhi
 Jeremiah
 Shemnon
 Jonas
 Zedekiah
 Isaiah
 Amos
 Amos II
 Ammaron
 Mormon
 Moroni

In Ether
 Mahonri Moriancumer, the brother of Jared
 Ether

Biblical prophets
Various Old Testament prophets are also quoted or mentioned in the Book of Mormon. These include:
 Adam
 Noah
 Joseph 
 Jacob
 Moses
 Isaiah
 David via Psalms
 John the Revelator

See also
 The Church of Jesus Christ of Latter-day Saints
 President of the Church
 Prophet, seer, and revelator
 Table of prophets of Abrahamic religions

Further reading

References

External links
 List of Book of Mormon prophets

 
Prophets